The 2020 Kazakhstan Premier League was the 29th season of the Kazakhstan Premier League, the highest football league competition in Kazakhstan. FC Astana were the defending champions after winning their sixth title the previous season.

Season events

COVID-19
On 13 March, the Football Federation of Kazakhstan announced all league fixtures would be played behind closed doors for the foreseeable future due to the COVID-19 pandemic. On 16 March the Football Federation of Kazakhstan suspended all football until 15 April.

On 26 June, it was announced that the league would resume on 1 July, with no fans being permitted to watch the games. The league was suspended for a second time on 3 July, for an initial two weeks, due to an increase in COVID-19 cases in the country.

Irtysh Pavlodar
On 30 May, the Professional Football League of Kazakhstan announced that Irtysh Pavlodar had withdrawn from the league due to financial issues, with all their matches being excluded from the league results.

Teams
FC Aktobe and FC Atyrau were relegated at the end of the 2019 season, and were replaced by FC Kyzylzhar and FC Caspiy.

Team overview

Personnel and kits

Note: Flags indicate national team as has been defined under FIFA eligibility rules. Players and Managers may hold more than one non-FIFA nationality.

Foreign players
The number of foreign players was restricted to eight per KPL team. A team could use only five foreign players on the field in each game.
For the 2020 season, the KFF announced that players from countries of the Eurasian Economic Union would not be counted towards a club's foreign player limit.

In bold: Players that have been capped for their national team.

Managerial changes

Regular season

League table

Results

Games 1–20

Statistics

Scoring
 First goal of the season: Pieros Sotiriou for Astana against Kyzylzhar

Top scorers

Clean sheets

References

External links
Official website 

Kazakhstan Premier League seasons
1
Kazakh
Kazakh
Kazakhstan Premier League, 2020